Northampton County is the name of several counties in the United States:

 Northampton County, North Carolina 
 Northampton County, Pennsylvania 
 Northampton County, Virginia

See also
 Northamptonshire, England, historically and formally sometimes called the County of Northampton